Melluži Station is a railway station on the Torņakalns – Tukums II Railway in the Melluži residential neighbourhood of Jūrmala, Latvia.

There is a single station building on the north side of the railway, accessed from Mežsargu Iela.

References

External links 

Railway stations in Latvia
Railway stations opened in 1914